Bulgaria competed at the 1996 Summer Olympics in Atlanta, United States. 110 competitors, 74 men and 36 women, took part in 89 events in 17 sports.

Medalists

Gold
 Stefka Kostadinova — Athletics, Women's High Jump
 Daniel Petrov — Boxing, Men's Light Flyweight 
 Valentin Yordanov — Wrestling, Men's Freestyle Flyweight (52 kg)

Silver
 Serafim Todorov — Boxing, Men's Featherweight 
 Tontcho Tontchev — Boxing, Men's Lightweight 
 Krasimir Dunev — Gymnastics, Men's Horizontal Bar
 Emil Milev — Shooting, Men's Rapid-Fire Pistol 
 Diana Iorgova — Shooting, Women's Sport Pistol
 Yoto Yotov — Weightlifting, Men's Middleweight (76 kg)
 Maia Tabakova, Ivelina Taleva, Vjara Vatachka, Ina Deltcheva, Valentina Kevlian, and Maria Koleva — Gymnastics,  Women's Rhythmic Group Competition

Bronze
 Tanyu Kiryakov — Shooting, Men's Air Pistol
 Mariya Grozdeva — Shooting, Women's Air Pistol 
 Sevdalin Minchev — Weightlifting, Men's Flyweight (54 kg)
 Nikolay Peshalov — Weightlifting, Men's Bantamweight (59 kg)
 Andrian Dushev and Milko Kazanov — Canoeing, Men's K2 1,000 metres Kayak Pairs

Archery

Bulgaria sent only one archer to Atlanta.  He was defeated in the first round.

Athletics

Men's Long Jump
 Ivaylo Mladenov
 Qualification — NM (→ did not advance)

Men's Marathon
 Khristo Stefanov — 2:18.29 (→ 30th place)
 Petko Stefanov — 2:29.06 (→ 80th place)

Women's High Jump
 Stefka Kostadinova 
 Qualification — 1.93m
 Final — 2.05m (→  Gold Medal)
 Venelina Veneva 
 Qualification — 1.80m (→ did not advance)

Women's Javelin Throw
 Sonya Radicheva
 Qualification — did not start (→ did not advance)

Women's Discus Throw 
 Atanaska Angelova 
 Qualification — 59.82m (→ did not advance)

Women's Shot Put 
 Svetla Mitkova 
 Qualification — 17.48m (→ did not advance)

Women's Long Jump 
 Iva Prandzheva
 Qualification — 6.62m 
 Final — 6.82m (→ 7th place)

Women's Triple Jump
 Iva Prandzheva
 Qualification — 14.61m 
 Final — 14.92m (→ 4th place)

Badminton

Boxing

Men's Flyweight (— 48 kg)
Daniel Petrov →  Gold Medal
 First Round — Bye
 Second Round — Defeated Nshan Munchyan (Armenia), 11-5 
 Quarter Finals — Defeated Somrot Kamsing (Thailand), 18-6 
 Semi Finals — Defeated Oleg Kiryukhin (Ukraine), 17-8 
 Final — Defeated Mansueto Velasco (Philippines), 19-6

Men's Flyweight (— 51 kg)
Yuliyan Strogov
 First Round — Lost to Damaen Kelly (Ireland), 11-12

Men's Bantamweight (— 54 kg)
Aleksandar Khristov
 First Round — Lost to Carlos Barreto (Venezuela), 3-9

Men's Featherweight (— 57 kg)
Serafim Todorov →  Silver Medal
 First Round — Defeated Yevheniy Shestakov (Ukraine), 11-4 
 Second Round — Defeated Robert Peden (Australia), 20-8 
 Quarter Finals — Defeated Falk Huste (Germany), 14-6 
 Semi Finals — Defeated Floyd Mayweather Jr. (United States), 10-9 
 Final — Lost to Kamsing Somluck (Thailand), 5-8

Men's Lightweight (— 60 kg)
Tontcho Tontchev →  Silver Medal
 First Round — Defeated Oktavian Taykou (Moldova), referee stopped contest in second round
 Second Round — Defeated Dennis Zimba (Zambia), 17-9
 Quarter Finals — Defeated Michael Strange (Canada), 16-10
 Semi Finals — Defeated Terrance Cauthen (United States), 15-12
 Final — Lost to Hocine Soltani (Algeria), 3-3 (referee decision)

Men's Light Welterweight (— 63,5 kg)
Radoslav Suslekov
 First Round — Lost to Babak Moghimi (Iran), 3-11

Canoeing

Diving

Women's 10m Platform
 Radoslava Georgieva
 Semi Finals — 402.54 pt(→  16th place)

Fencing

Three fencers, one man and two women, represented Bulgaria in 1996.

Men's épée
 Iliya Mechkov

Women's foil
 Anna Angelova
 Ivana Georgieva

Gymnastics

Judo

Rhythmic gymnastics

Rowing

Shooting

Swimming

Men's 100m Butterfly
 Denislav Kalchev
 Heat — 54.81 (→ did not advance, 26th place)

Men's 200m Individual Medley
 Denislav Kalchev
 Heat — 2:08.16 (→ did not advance, 30th place)

Tennis

Volleyball

Men's Indoor Team Competition
Preliminary Round (Group A)
 Lost to Cuba (0-3)
 Defeated Brazil (3-0)
 Lost to Argentina (1-3)
 Defeated Poland (3-0)
 Defeated United States (3-2)
Quarterfinals
 Lost to Netherlands (1-3)
Classification Matches
 5th/8th place: Lost to Cuba (1-3)
 7th/8th place: Defeated Argentina (3-1) → 7th place
Team Roster
Lubomir Ganev 
Ivaylo Gavrilov 
Plamen Hristov 
Evgeni Ivanov 
Nikolay Ivanov 
Plamen Konstantinov 
Lyudmil Naydenov 
Nayden Naydenov 
Petar Ouzounov 
Martin Stoev 
Dimo Tonev (captain) 
Nikolay Jeliazkov

Weightlifting

Men's Light-Heavyweight
Krastu Milev
 Final — 160.0 + 200.0 = 360.0 (→ 8th place)

Wrestling

References

External links

Nations at the 1996 Summer Olympics
1996
Olympics